Dimitris Vardoulakis (born 1975) is a Greek philosopher and Associate Professor of philosophy in the School of Humanities and Communication Arts at Western Sydney University. He works in the tradition of Continental philosophy, and has published on a variety of topics, including the relation between literature and philosophy, power and sovereignty.

Career
He received his PhD in philosophy from Monash University and is a winner of Excellence in Leadership Award.

Vardoulakis is the author of The Doppelganger: Literature's Philosophy (2011, Fordham University Press) and Sovereignty and Its Other: Toward the Dejustification of Violence (2013, Fordham University Press). He co-edited After Blanchot: Literature, Criticism, Philosophy (2005, Delaware Press) with Leslie Hill and Brian Nelson and was the sole editor of Spinoza Now (2011, University of Minnesota Press). He co-edited a special issue of SubStance entitled "The Political Animal" with Chris Danta, and a special issue of Angelaki entitled "The Politics of Place" with Andrew Benjamin.

Vardoulakis is the chair of the lecture series Thinking Out Loud: The Sydney Lectures in Philosophy and Society and editor of the linked book series published by Fordham University Press. He is the co-editor of the book series Incitements, published with Edinburgh University Press.

Bibliography
 Vardoulakis, D. (2013), Stasis Before the State: Nine Theses on Agonistic Democracy, New York: Fordham University Press 
 Vardoulakis, D. (2016), Freedom From the Free Will: On Kafka's Laughter, State University of New York Press 
 Vardoulakis, D. (2013), Sovereignty and Its Other: Toward the Dejustification of Violence, New York: Fordham University Press 
 Vardoulakis, D., ed. (2011), Spinoza Now, Minneapolis: University of Minnesota Press
 Vardoulakis, D. (2010), The Doppelganger: Literature's Philosophy, New York: Fordham University Press 
 Hill, L., Nelso, B. and Vardoulakis, D., eds. (2005), After Blanchot: Literature, Criticism, Philosophy, : Delaware Press

See also
Diego Bubbio

References

External links
 Dimitris Vardoulakis at UWS
 Dimitris Vardoulakis

Living people
21st-century Australian philosophers
Philosophers of nihilism
Continental philosophers
Monash University alumni
Academic staff of Western Sydney University
Hermeneutists
1975 births
Derrida scholars
Spinoza scholars
Walter Benjamin scholars
Philosophers of literature
Political philosophers
21st-century Greek philosophers